Mohács (Croatian and Bunjevac: Mohač; ;) is a town in Baranya County, Hungary, on the right bank of the Danube.

Etymology
The name probably comes from the Slavic *Mъchačь,*Mocháč: mъchъ (moss, Hungarian moha is a loanword from Slavic/) + the Slavic suffix -ačь, like  Slovak Mochnáč or Czech Macháč. See 1093/1190/1388 Mohach.

History
Two famous battles took place in the vicinity of Mohács:

 Battle of Mohács, 1526
 Battle of Mohács, 1687

These battles represented the beginning and end, respectively, of the Ottoman domination of Hungary.

In Roman times there was a camp on the banks of the Danube near Mohács.

In the medieval Kingdom of Hungary, Mohács formed part of the historical Baranya county, and during Ottoman rule it functioned as the administrative seat of the Sanjak of Mohács, an Ottoman administrative unit.
After the Habsburgs took the area from the Ottomans, Mohács was included in the restored Baranya county.

In 1910 the population of the Mohács district numbered 56,909 people, of whom 21,951 spoke German, 20,699 Hungarian, 4,312 Serbian, and 421 Croatian. Another 9,600 inhabitants were listed as speaking "other languages" (presumably Bunjevac and Šokac).

Until the end of World War II, Danube Swabians comprised the majority of the inhabitants - called locally  Stifolder, because their ancestors came in the 17th and 18th centuries from Fulda (district). Most of the former German settlers were expelled to Allied-occupied Germany and Allied-occupied Austria in 1945-1948, in accordance with the 1945 Potsdam Agreement.

Events
Every spring, the town hosts the annual Busójárás carnival.

Demographics 
According to the 2011 census, the total population of Mohács was 17,808, of whom there were 15,842 (84.2%) Hungarians, 1,723 (9.7%) Germans, 700 (3.9%) Croats, and 537 (3%) Romani. 14% of the total population did not declare their ethnicity. In Hungary, people can declare more than one ethnicity (dual identity), so the sum exceeds the total population.

Twin towns – sister cities

Mohács is twinned with:

 Beli Manastir, Croatia
 Bensheim, Germany
 Beykoz, Turkey
 Câmpia Turzii, Romania
 Siemianowice Śląskie, Poland
 Sveti Filip i Jakov, Croatia
 Wattrelos, France

Notable citizens 
 Ferenc Pfaff (1851–1913), Hungarian architect
 Endre Rozsda (1913–1919), Hungarian-French Painter
 Norbert Michelisz (1984), Hungarian racing driver

Sport
Mohácsi TE is the town's association football club.

Photos

References

External links

  in Hungarian, English and German

Populated places in Baranya County
Hungarian German communities
Croatian communities in Hungary
Serb communities in Hungary
Baranya (region)
History of Baranya (region)